Jasrana is a medium sized village in the Gohana tehsil of Sonipat district of the Indian state of Haryana. Its geo-coordinates are: Latitude:- 28.9587935; Longitude:- 76.7747687. It is surrounded by the villages named Giwana (Sonipat), Farmana Majra(Sonipat), Gorar (Sonipat), Mungan (Rohtak), and Polangi (Rohtak). The village is quite old but the exact history is not known. It was once famous for its wrestlers and an Arya Samaj poet named Johari Singh. The chief occupation of its residents is agriculture. The main crops are wheat and rice. Some 30 years back, sugarcane was also grown in plenty by the farmers, but they have been switching to rice as it gives more profit. Kaliraman and Malik are the gotras of Jats in this village.Other than Jats, there are many castes in this village too. As per the 2011 census, the population of the village is 3836. The male population of the village is 2106 and the female population is 1730. Thus, the sex ratio is 821:1000.

The village falls under Baroda Assembly constituency and Sonipat Lok Sabha constituency.Rohtak and Sonipat are the nearest cities from this village.Rohtak city can be reached from this village via Polangi ,Rurki, Bhalaut and Bohar.Sonipat City can be reached via Farmana Majra, Mahipur ,Salimsar Majra, Lohari Tibba, Bhatgaon, Bagru, Sagarpur and Mehlana. The distance of Rohtak city from this village is around 20 KM.The distance of Sonipat city from this village is around 27 KM.

Villages in Sonipat district